Sandie Fitzgibbon (born 1964 in Cork) is a former camogie player selected on the camogie team of the century in 2004, and winner of six All Ireland medals in 1982, 1983, 1992, 1993, 1995 and 1997.

She played for Glen Rovers Club with whom she won four All Ireland Club Championships. She also holds one Colleges All Ireland, three Minor All Ireland, seven National League and two Gael Linn interprovincial medals. She captained Cork to victory in 1992 when they defeated Wexford.

Her camogie awards include Munster Young Camogie Player for 1983, National Irish Bank Player of the Year in 1992 and 1995, and twice Jury's Hotel Sports Star of the Month. In 2000, she received the Cork Lord Mayor's Millennium Camogie Award.

In 2013, she was given a Northside and District Hall of Fame Award.

Citation
Her team of the century citation read: "possessing huge natural sporting ability, compact and tidy in her movements, allied to great speed, she was a most influential player who could control a game with ease. Sandie was very polished performer whether at midfield or centre-back."

Other sports
Her basketball awards include three National Cup and five National League titles, 64 senior basketball caps for Ireland, and the Delta Air Lines Olympic Award.

References

Cork camogie players
Date of birth missing (living people)
Living people
Irish women's basketball players
Ireland women's national basketball team players
1964 births